The Mountain Time Zone of North America keeps time by subtracting seven hours from Coordinated Universal Time (UTC) when standard time (UTC−07:00) is in effect, and by subtracting six hours during daylight saving time (UTC−06:00). The clock time in this zone is based on the mean solar time at the 105th meridian west of the Greenwich Observatory.  In the United States, the exact specification for the location of time zones and the dividing lines between zones is set forth in the Code of Federal Regulations at 49 CFR 71.

In the United States and Canada, this time zone is generically called Mountain Time (MT). Specifically, it is Mountain Standard Time (MST) when observing standard time, and Mountain Daylight Time (MDT) when observing daylight saving time. The term refers to the Rocky Mountains, which range from British Columbia to New Mexico. In the US and Canada, the Mountain Time Zone is to the east of the Pacific Time Zone and to the west of the Central Time Zone.

In some areas, starting in 2007, the local time changes from MST to MDT at 2am MST to 3am MDT on the second Sunday in March and returns at 2am MDT to 1am MST on the first Sunday in November.

Sonora in Mexico and most of Arizona in the United States do not observe daylight saving time (DST), and during the spring, summer, and autumn months they are on the same time as Pacific Daylight Time. The Navajo Nation, most of which lies within Arizona but extends into Utah and New Mexico (which do observe DST), does observe DST, although the Hopi Reservation, as well as some Arizona state offices lying within the Navajo Nation, do not.

The largest city in the Mountain Time Zone is Phoenix, Arizona; the Phoenix metropolitan area is the largest metropolitan area in the zone.

Canada

One province and one territory are fully contained in the Mountain Time Zone:
Alberta
Yukon (no DST)

On September 24, 2020, Yukon switched to the Mountain Standard Time year-round. Therefore, clocks in Yukon and Alberta are the same in the winter, and Alberta is one hour ahead in summer. Previously, the territory had used the Pacific Time Zone with daylight saving time: UTC−8 in winter and UTC−7 in summer.

One province and one territory are split between the Mountain Time Zone and the Pacific Time Zone:
British Columbia – northeastern and southeastern regions
Northwest Territories – Tungsten

One territory and one province are split between the Mountain Time Zone and the Central Time Zone:
Nunavut: Kitikmeot Region 
Saskatchewan: Lloydminster and vicinity

Mexico

The following states have the same time as Mountain Time Zone:

Baja California Sur
Nayarit: except for the Bahía de Banderas municipality, which uses the Central Time Zone.
Sonora: no daylight saving time, always on MST.
Sinaloa
Revillagigedo Islands (Colima): three of the four islands have the same time as Mountain Time Zone: Socorro Island, San Benedicto Island and Roca Partida.

United States

Six states are fully contained in the Mountain Time Zone:
Colorado
Montana
New Mexico
Utah
Wyoming
Arizona (does not use daylight saving time except for Navajo Nation)
 
Three states are split between the Mountain Time Zone and the Pacific Time Zone. The following locations observe Mountain Time:
Idaho: Southern Idaho
Oregon: the majority of Malheur County
Nevada: West Wendover
 
Five states are split between the Mountain Time Zone and the Central Time Zone. The following locations observe Mountain Time:
Kansas: Sherman, Wallace, Greeley and Hamilton Counties
Nebraska: western third
North Dakota: the SW corner counties (Adams, Billings, Bowman, Golden Valley, Grant, Hettinger, Slope, Stark) observe MST. The counties of McKenzie, Dunn, and Sioux are split.
South Dakota: western half
Texas: El Paso, Hudspeth, and northwestern Culberson Counties

Major metropolitan areas 
The following is a list of major cities located within the Mountain Time Zone, ordered alphabetically.

 Albuquerque, New Mexico
 Arvada, Colorado
 Aurora, Colorado
 Boise, Idaho
 Boulder, Colorado
 Billings, Montana
 Calgary, Alberta
 Centennial, Colorado
 Chandler, Arizona
 Chihuahua, Chihuahua
 Ciudad Juárez, Chihuahua
 Ciudad Obregón, Sonora
 Colorado Springs, Colorado
 Culiacán, Sinaloa
 Denver, Colorado
 Edmonton, Alberta
 El Paso, Texas
 Flagstaff, Arizona
 Fort Collins, Colorado
 Gilbert, Arizona
 Glendale, Arizona
 Greeley, Colorado
 Hermosillo, Sonora
 La Paz, Baja California Sur
 Lake Havasu City, Arizona
 Lakewood, Colorado
 Lethbridge, Alberta
 Los Mochis, Sinaloa
 Mazatlán, Sinaloa
 Mesa, Arizona
 Missoula, Montana
 Nogales, Sonora
 Peoria, Arizona
 Phoenix, Arizona
 Provo, Utah
 Pueblo, Colorado
 Rapid City, South Dakota
 Red Deer, Alberta
 Salt Lake City, Utah
 San Luis Río Colorado, Sonora
 Scottsdale, Arizona
 Surprise, Arizona
 Tempe, Arizona
 Tepic, Nayarit
 Thornton, Colorado
 Tucson, Arizona
 West Jordan, Utah
 West Valley City, Utah
 Westminster, Colorado
 Yuma, Arizona

See also
 Effects of time zones on North American broadcasting

Notes

References

External links
 World time zone map 
 U.S. time zone map
 History of U.S. time zones and UTC conversion 
 Canada time zone map
 Time zones for major world cities
 Official times across Canada
 Official times across Mexico
 Canada time map
 U.S. time map

Time zones
Time in Canada
Time in Mexico
Time zones in the United States